Craig Raymond Fry was a Democratic member of the Indiana House of Representatives, representing the 5th District between 1988 and 2012.

External links
State Representative Craig R. Fry official Indiana State Legislature site
 

Democratic Party members of the Indiana House of Representatives
1952 births
Living people
People from Mishawaka, Indiana